Aksel Kallas may refer to:
 Aksel Kallas (politician) (1890–1922), Estonian politician 
 Aksel Kallas (actor) (1910–1975), Estonian actor and director